Complete Epic may refer to:

The Godfather 1901-1959: The Complete Epic
Marvel Complete Epics, a series of large trade paperback collections of Marvel Comics storylines